Barrie City Council is the governing body for the City of Barrie, in Ontario, Canada.

The council consists of the Mayor of Barrie and ten councillors, who represent the ten wards of the city. The council posts agendas for council meetings.

There are four city departments: the Chief Administrators Office, the Community Operations Division, the Corporate Services Division, and the Infrastructure, Development & Culture Division.

2003-2006 Council

2006-2010 Council
The city of Barrie had an election along with many other Ontario communities, including Toronto, on 13 November 2006.

2010-2014 Council
The city of Barrie had an election along with many other Ontario communities, including Toronto, on 25 October 2010.

2014-2018 Council

2018-2022 Council

2022-2026 Council

References

Municipal councils in Ontario
Municipal government of Barrie